Ivatsevichy (Ivacevičy) District is an administrative subdivision, a raion of Brest Region, in Belarus. Its administrative center is Ivatsevichy.

In this district the sixth largest lake in Belarus Vygonoschanskoye Lake is situated.

Demographics
At the time of the Belarus Census (2009), Ivatsevichy Raion had a population of 59,906. Of these, 94.4% were of Belarusian, 3.7% Russian, 0.9% Ukrainian and 0.5% Polish ethnicity. 76.5% spoke Belarusian and 22.7% Russian as their native language.

Notable residents 

 Andrzej Tadeusz Bonawentura Kościuszko (English: Andrew Thaddeus Bonaventure Kosciuszko; 1746, Mieračoŭščyna estate – 1817), national hero in Poland, Lithuania, Belarus and the United States
 Bishop Mikalaj (Šamiacila) (1877, Aborava village — 1933) — bishop of Slutsk, victim of Stalinism

References 

 
Districts of Brest Region